Jatta Ismail Khel is a village and Union Council of Karak District in the Khyber-Pakhtunkhwa province of  Pakistan. It is located at 33°20'N 71°17'E with an altitude of 550 metres (1,807 feet).

References

Populated places in Karak District
Karak District